Djibril Compaoré (born 1 August 1983) is a Burkinabé football (soccer) striker who plays for ASFA Yennega.

Career
Compaoré began his career with ASFA Yennega and was promoted to the senior team in 2000.

International
He was two years member of the Burkina Faso national football team and played for his country at 2003 Afro-Asian Games. Compaoré was a member of the Burkinabé team at 1999 FIFA U-17 World Championship in New Zealand.

Privates
Dhibril's older brother Daouda Compaoré played with him for ASFA Yennega and was member of the Burkina Faso national football team.

See also
List of one-club men

References

External links
 

1983 births
Living people
Burkinabé footballers
ASFA Yennenga players
Burkina Faso international footballers
Sportspeople from Ouagadougou
Association football forwards
21st-century Burkinabé people